Sard (also known as Sard Kūl-e Rād) is a village in Mahru Rural District, Zaz va Mahru District, Aligudarz County, Lorestan Province, Iran. At the 2006 census, its population was 55, in 9 families.

References 

Towns and villages in Aligudarz County